Charazeh is a village in Gilvan Rural District, in the Central District of Tarom County, Zanjan Province, Iran. At the 2006 census, its population was 36, in 12 families.

References 

Populated places in Tarom County